The 1913 Auckland Rugby League season was the 5th season of the Auckland Rugby league.

The first grade competition began on 3 May with the same 6 teams that had competed in the 1912 season, however Manukau Rovers pulled out of the competition midway through the season as they struggled to put a full team on the field. The Eden Ramblers also pulled out at the same time. North Shore Albions were crowned champions for the first time.

Other clubs competing in lower grades were Otahuhu, Northcote Ramblers now known as the Northcote Tigers, and Ellerslie Wanderers, who later became known as the Ellerslie Eagles. A match was also played between Avondale and New Lynn in Avondale on 13 September. The match was won by New Lynn by 23 points to 8.

News

Club teams and grade participation

Switching codes 
Karl Ifwersen switched from rugby union where he had been playing in Auckland and made his debut appearance for North Shore Albions. He was to go on to have a remarkable rugby league career and his scoring feats were un-rivalled through the 1910s in Auckland rugby league. While New Zealand representatives Graham Cook and Cecil King had moved from Wellington and made debut appearances for Newton Rangers.

Charles Savory controversy 
In a match involving Ponsonby and Manukau in Onehunga, Charles Savory was accused of kicking an opponent. The incident was not seen by the referee but an Auckland Rugby League official claimed to have seen it and as a result Savory was banned for life by Auckland Rugby League. Savory had been selected to play for New Zealand on their tour of Australia and as a result of the ban was unable to make the trip. When the evidence was presented to New Zealand League they said that the evidence was not sufficient to justify the penalty and refused to confirm it. Auckland Rugby League then decided to strike Savory off the list of registered players thus making him ineligible to play in Auckland. Auckland selector Ronald MacDonald chose Savory to play against Wellington in their match on 23 August but was told at an Auckland Rugby League meeting that he was ineligible and they questioned why he had chosen him to play. MacDonald replied "one reason is because he is one of the best forwards in the Dominion. What was he suspended for?". A lengthy discussion followed and MacDonald refused to withdraw Savory's name from selection and a motion was then passed that MacDonald be removed from his position as Auckland selector. This was carried unanimously with Mr Angus Campbell appointed selector, and Morgan Hayward chosen to replace Savory in the side for the match with Wellington.

Death of Adolphus Theodore Bust whilst playing
Tragedy struck in May in a 3rd grade match between Ellerslie and Ponsonby when 26 year old Adolphus Theodore Bust was severely injured and later passed away as a result of his injuries. The death occurred at the Ellerslie Domain. He was said to have collided with an opposing player and the two of them fell to the ground with a third player falling on top of them. The other two men rose to their feet to carry on playing but Bust remained stationary on the ground. Dr. Baber was called to attend from his residence in Remuera but he found that Bust's spinal cord was fractured near the base of the skull and he recommended he be taken to hospital however Bust's father decided to have him taken to his home in Ellerslie. He was unable to be revived and died at 8.30am the following morning. After the incident the deceased father said he witnessed the incident and was satisfied that it was an accident. Martin Ellis, the player involved in the tackle said that he was running down the field and Bust was waiting to tackle him and had dived and caught Ellis by the legs but his neck struck him on the hip and they both fell to the ground. The coroner returned the verdict that nobody was to blame for the death. None of the Ellerslie teams took the field the following weekend out of respect.

Myers Cup (first grade competition)
Eighteen regular season matches were played before North Shore Albions were awarded the title with a 5 win, 1 draw, 1 loss record.

Myers Cup standings

Myers Cup fixtures

Round 1 
Bertram Charles Denyer scored Eden's only try in their loss to Ponsonby. After the Eden side dropped out of the competition he joined the Newton Rangers. He enlisted in the war effort and was killed in action at Gallipoli on May 8, 1915.

Round 2

Round 3

Round 4 
In the Ponsonby match with North Shore Harry Fricker was ordered off for striking an opponent. The act was missed by the referee but seen by the line umpire. The match between Manukau and Eden was reported as a win to Manukau and a win to Eden in differing reports.

Round 5 
Manukau defaulted their match to North Shore Albions. The later arrived in Onehunga to find that their opponents could not muster a team. Jim Rukutai and other prominent players were said to be suffering from influenza. This was to be Manukau's last game in the senior grade for decades as they forfeited the following week along with Eden and dropped out of the senior competition. Rukutai was diagnosed with smallpox and was put into isolation in a Point Chevalier hospital. However it was soon after realised that he was actually suffering from a severe case of chicken pox and he made a full recovery soon after. Eden were to cease playing as a club a few seasons later and never returned.

Round 6 
A somewhat unusual event occurred in the match between Ponsonby and North Shore when it was briefly suspended after a player from North Shore dropped his false teeth. He was inevitably subjected to some “good-natured banter from the crowd”.

Round 7 
With Manukau and Eden both disbanding their senior teams Pullen from Manukau transferred to North Shore and played for them, while Don Kenealy of Eden transferred and played for City.

Knockout competition
After North Shore had won the championship the league decided to play a knockout competition between the four remaining teams. Newton and City both won their matches and progressed to the final.

Round 1

Knockout final 
City were joined by Jim Rukutai for the match following Manukau's senior team disbanding.

Top try and point scorers
Scoring included both the first grade championship and the knockout matches. A large number of matches did not have the scorers named meaning the following lists are incomplete. Points missing are as follows: Newton Rangers (22), City Rovers (18), Ponsonby United (25), Eden Ramblers (15), and Manukau Rovers (18).

Exhibition Match

Hamilton v City Rovers
On July 19 City Rovers traveled to Hamilton to play the local side.

Avondale v New Lynn
On September 13 Avondale played New Lynn in their "annual football match". Several of the players including Bert and John Denyer, Kenealy, Bond, and Bob Biggs had played for the recently folded Eden Ramblers who were based in the Avondale/Point Chevalier area.

Thacker Shield
On 7 September North Shore Albions journeyed to Christchurch to play against Sydenham to play for the Thacker Shield. At the start of the season Dr. Thacker, president of the Canterbury league had presented the shield for competition amongst the senior clubs of Christchurch but he had stipulated that it was open to competition to any club in New Zealand. When North Shore won the Auckland championship they immediately issued a challenge to Sydenham. North Shore sent a strong team south but were without Karl Ifwersen and Stan Walters who were representing New Zealand against the touring New South Wales side.

Lower grades
The draws were always reported in the New Zealand Herald and the Auckland Star however only some of the results were reported in the Monday editions. As a result the tables are incomplete and are compiled of known results.

Grades were made of the following teams with the winning team in bold:
Second Grade: City Rovers, Ellerslie United, Newton Rangers, North Shore Albions, Northcote Ramblers, Otahuhu United (runner up), Ponsonby United. Ponsonby won the championship undefeated for the second year though Otahuhu did manage to draw with them 5-5 on June 7. Ponsonby defeated Otahuhu 22-9 in the final on July 19. The Ellerslie side withdrew from the competition following the death of 3rd grade player Adolphus Bust. He was seriously injured during a match in May and died later in the evening.
Third Grade: City Rovers (runner up), Ellerslie United, Eden Ramblers A, Eden Ramblers B, Manukau Rovers A, Manukau Rovers B, North Shore Albions, Northcote Ramblers, Otahuhu United, Ponsonby United. Ponsonby won the championship after defeating City Rovers 16-3 in the final on August 9. The Ellerslie side withdrew from the competition following the death of 3rd grade player Adolphus Bust during a match in May.
Fourth Grade: City Rovers, Eden Ramblers, Manukau Rovers, Newton Rangers, North Shore Albions, Otahuhu United, Ponsonby United (runner up). Otahuhu defeated Ponsonby in the championship final on July 19 though no score was reported.

Second grade standings
{|
|-
|

Third grade standings
{|
|-
|

Fourth grade standings
{|
|-
|

Representative season
1913 was a very busy year for the Auckland representative team as they played 10 matches recording a 7 win, 3 loss record. Their three defeats were against the touring New South Wales team and then on a two match end of season tour to Taranaki and Wellington.

The first representative fixture of the season was played on 28 June against a Country selection at Victoria Park, Auckland. Three thousand spectators attended and 117 pounds was collected. Further matches were played against Taranaki, Hawke's Bay, Nelson, Canterbury, Wellington, and New South Wales. Auckland also played an exhibition match in Pukekohe against the Auckland club champions North Shore Albions.

On August 9 Auckland Juniors beat Waikato Juniors 33-5 in Huntly.

Representative matches

Auckland v Waikato Country

Auckland v Taranaki (Northern Union C.C.)

Auckland V Hawke’s Bay (Northern Union C.C.)

Auckland V Nelson (Northern Union C.C.) 
A trial match was played as curtain-raiser between A and B teams resulting in a win to the former by 11 points to 3.

Auckland v Canterbury (Northern Union C.C.)

Auckland v North Shore Albions (exhibition match)

Auckland v Wellington (Northern Union C.C.)

Auckland v New South Wales 
A curtain raiser was played between Auckland B and North Shore which resulted in a 5-5 draw.

Auckland v Taranaki 
Thomas McClymont injured his arm late in the first half and went off but came back on. Then early in the second half he retired permanently meaning Auckland only had 12 players. Bob Mitchell and Stan Walters joined the team in New Plymouth having left Wellington after the New Zealand match there. Karl Ifwersen was supposed to also join but he had been injured in New Zealand's match so went directly back to Auckland. George Seagar who had gone on tour was refereeing at late notice as Taranaki had been unable to organise a suitable referee. The Taranaki forwards were said to have dominated the match and while the Auckland backs played brilliantly they failed to finish many chances.

Auckland v Wellington 
A player named 'Murdoch' appeared for Auckland and this is likely to have been the treasurer/manager of the Auckland side Adam Murdoch. There were no team lists in any of the newspapers and only 12 players were mentioned by name in the match reports. When Murdoch passed away in September 1944 the Auckland Rugby League sent their condolences to his family. Those were Mansell, Cook, Woodward, Kenealy, Tobin, Seagar, Webb, Murdoch, Mitchell, Walters, Rukutai, and Denize. The other one who may have played is Clark, Manning, or Fricker who had all been with the touring side in Taranaki.

Auckland representative matches played and scorers

 Adam Murdoch was a member of the Ponsonby United club but non-playing. Was on tour as manager for the Taranaki and Wellington games.

References

External links
 Auckland Rugby League Official Site

Auckland Rugby League seasons
Auckland Rugby League